Charles Creighton may refer to:

 Charles Creighton (physician) (1847–1927), British physician and medical author
 Charles Creighton (referee) (1876–1949), Irish-American soccer referee
 Charles F. Creighton (1863–1907), Attorney General of the Kingdom of Hawaii, 1892
 Charles W. Creighton (1885–1947), American politician and lawyer